The Starling was a small American nuclear bomb developed in the 1950s that was used as the primary in several US thermonuclear weapons.

The Starling was developed by Lawrence Livermore National Laboratory. As tested in Nougat Cimarron, the primary had a yield of  but is also described as being . It was a two-point primary, like Tsetse, Kinglet, Robin, and Gnat.

Starling is reportedly the primary for the W55 (which also used Kinglet) and W56 warheads. Starling and Kinglet are reportedly the immediate successors to Robin.

See also
 List of nuclear weapons
 Teller-Ulam design

References

Nuclear warheads of the United States